The Basketball tournament at the 1999 All-Africa Games was held in Johannesburg, South Africa from September 11 to 18, 1999. The winners were Egypt won the men's tournament  and Senegal won the women's tournament,  both ended the round robin tournament with a 5–0 unbeaten record.

Competition format
A round-robin tournament was played.

Calendar

Men's competition

Women's competition

Medal summary

Medal table

Events

Final standings

External links
 Men's tournament todor66.com
 Women's tournament todor66.com

References

Basketball at the African Games
1999 All-Africa Games
1999 in African basketball
International basketball competitions hosted by South Africa